The Sinful Village is a 1954 West German comedy film directed by Ferdinand Dörfler and starring Joe Stöckel, Günther Lüders and Renate Mannhardt. It was based on the play Das sündige Dorf by Max Neal. It is a remake of the 1940 film of the same title.

It was shot at the Bavaria Studios in Munich. The film's sets were designed by the art director Wolf Englert and Max Mellin.

Main cast
Joe Stöckel as Thomas Stangassinger
Günther Lüders as Christian Süßbier
Renate Mannhardt as Afra
Hanna Hutten as Vevi
Elise Aulinger as Therese Stangassinger
Beppo Brem as Wegscheidbauer
Walter Reyer as Sepp Stangassinger
Albert Rueprecht as Toni Stangassinger
Wastl Witt as Mathias Vogelhuber

See also
The Sinful Village (1940)
The Sinful Village (1966)

References

Bibliography
 Alexandra Ludewig. Screening Nostalgia: 100 Years of German Heimat Film. 2014.

External links
 

1954 films
1954 comedy films
German comedy films
West German films
1950s German-language films
German films based on plays
Remakes of German films
Films set in Bavaria
Films set in the Alps
1950s German films
Films shot at Bavaria Studios